What's Sauce for the Goose is a 1916 film featuring Oliver Hardy.

Cast
 Elsie MacLeod as Mrs. Plump
 Oliver Hardy as Mr. Boob Plump (as Babe Hardy)
 Billy Ruge as Runt

See also
 List of American films of 1916
 Filmography of Oliver Hardy

References

External links

1916 films
American silent short films
American black-and-white films
1916 comedy films
1916 short films
Silent American comedy films
American comedy short films
1910s American films